Andrew Alexander "Mike" Terry (July 18, 1940 – October 30, 2008) was an American saxophonist, songwriter, arranger, producer and musical director.  His baritone sax solos feature on the breakthrough hits of Martha and the Vandellas ("Heat Wave", 1963), and The Supremes ("Where Did Our Love Go", 1964). As a member of the Funk Brothers he performed on thousands of Motown recordings from 1960 to 1967, including at least seven US #1 hits. As was Motown's policy at the time, none of the studio musicians were credited by name. Terry was the musical arranger of the 1966 hit "Cool Jerk" by The Capitols, and later became a record producer, with partners including George Clinton, Sidney Barnes, and Jack Ashford.

Early life
Terry was born in Hempstead, Texas, a suburb of Houston, where his father ran a music store. His mother also played piano, and when he was 8 the family moved to Detroit, Michigan. At Cass Technical High School he took up the baritone saxophone, and also met future Motown trombonist/arranger Paul Riser. Terry's early musical influences included saxophonists Charlie Parker, Illinois Jacquet, King Curtis, and Bill Doggett.

Career
By the late 1950s, as a teen, Terry joined the group Popcorn and the Mohawks, which included future Motown staff musicians and producers Popcorn Wylie, Eddie Willis, James Jamerson, Lamont Dozier, and Norman Whitfield. The group recorded for Motown Records founder Berry Gordy with their first single, 1959's "Custer's Last Man/Shimmy Gully".

By 1960 Terry was a member of the Joe Hunter Band with Benny Benjamin, James Jamerson, Larry Veeder, and Hank Cosby, forming the basis of the ever-growing group of studio musicians contracted to Motown. Terry played in the horn section on Motown's first million-selling single, 1960's "Shop Around" by The Miracles. In 1961 he toured in Jackie Wilson's backing band, and in 1962 toured in Motown's first Motortown Revue, performing on the album Motor Town Revue Vol. 1: Recorded Live At The Apollo.
Terry also played on John Lee Hooker's 1962 single "Boom Boom", on Vee-Jay Records.

In 1963 his baritone saxophone solos and instrumental interludes were featured on hit Motown productions by Holland/Dozier/Holland including Martha and the Vandellas' breakthrough hit "Heat Wave" and Mary Wells' "You Lost the Sweetest Boy". In 1964 he soloed on the Supremes' breakthrough hit "Where Did Our Love Go", and their follow up "Baby Love". As a member of the group of studio musicians known as the Funk Brothers, he made thousands of recordings, usually in the horn section, with tenor saxophonist Hank Cosby. Motown's practice at the time was to not credit the names of the studio musicians.

Jason Ankeny of Allmusic.com wrote: 

Funk Brother, James Jamerson called him "Lil' Funk", (bandleader Earl Van Dyke was nicknamed "Big Funk").

Frustrated with a lack of opportunities to arrange or produce records at Motown, by the mid-1960s Terry enrolled at the Detroit Institute of Performing Arts to develop his musical skills. In 1966, he was the credited arranger and conductor of US#7 hit "Cool Jerk" by The Capitols, secretly recorded with the Funk Brothers for the Karen Records label.

By 1966, he and fellow Funk Brother Jack Ashford were planning a future collaboration as songwriters and producers, after playing sessions together for Ed Wingate at Golden World Records. In the mid-60s Terry worked with Wingate at Ric-Tic Records recording Edwin Starr, J. J. Barnes, Rose Batiste, and other artists. In 1966 Terry joined with George Clinton and Sidney Barnes to form the Geo-Si-Mik production team. Geo-Si-Mik produced records by acts including Clinton's group The Parliaments, Laura Lee, and The Adorables.

Also in 1966, Terry and Ashford formed Pied Piper Productions, writing, arranging, and producing records by acts including September Jones, Nancy Wilcox, Lorraine Chandler, Mikki Farrow, and Willie Kendrick.

In 1967, Terry left Motown and played on soul recordings in Philadelphia and Chicago. In December 1967, he became a staff arranger and producer for Epic Records, and the Okeh Records imprint, where he worked on records by artists including Johnny Robinson, Sandra Phillips, The Little Foxes, and Maxine Brown.

From the late 1960s to the late 1970s, he arranged or produced or worked as a musical director in New York, Los Angeles, Chicago, Atlanta, and Las Vegas. He was the arranger and orchestrator for the 1969 Broadway musical Buck White, featuring Muhammad Ali, and for Bill Cosby in Las Vegas. He also worked closely with Jo Armstead at both Giant Records, and Bill Cosby's label Tetragrammaton Records.

In 1975, he was a member of the Atlanta Disco Band with Dave Crawford, Earl Young, Robert Popwell and others. They released three dance singles that charted, plus one album on Ariola Records.

Terry worked on two blaxploitation films directed by Fred Williamson. He orchestrated music for Boss Nigger (1975), and wrote and produced music for No Way Back (1976), including songs by The Dells.

In the late 1970s he moved out of the music industry. Terry did not perform in the Funk Brothers reunion which led to the 2002 documentary Standing in the Shadows of Motown, (though he is listed under Honorable Mentions on a two disc DVD edition of the film).

Private life 
At one time Terry was married to singer and songwriter Mikki Farrow. He later married Liz, who predeceased him. He died in Detroit in 2008. He is survived by his children Bridgette, Michael, Matthew, and his step-children.

Honours 
In 2010 Mike Terry, as a member of the Funk Brothers, was inducted into the Michigan Rock and Roll Hall of Fame.
In 2014 Mike Terry was inducted into the Northern Soul Hall of Fame.

Note: Though Terry was a Motown studio musician, He is not personally listed in the following honours, which were mostly awarded to the 13 Funk Brothers who took part in the 2002 reunion.
In 2004 the Funk Brothers were awarded a Grammy Lifetime Achievement Award.
In 2007 the Funk Brothers were inducted into the Musicians Hall of Fame and Museum, in Nashville.
In 2013 the Funk Brothers were honored with a star on the Hollywood Walk of Fame.
In 2014 the Funk Brothers were inducted into the National Rhythm and Blues Hall of Fame, in Cleveland.

Selective discography

Singles

Albums
{| class="wikitable"
|-
! Year
! Title
! Artist
! Chart
! Mike Terry's role
|-
| 1963
| Motor-Town Revue Vol. 1: Recorded Live At The Apollo
| Various Artists
| US#47
| Baritone saxophone
|-
| 1964
| Where Did Our Love Go
| The Supremes
| US#2
| Baritone saxophone
|-
| 1965
| More Hits by The Supremes
| The Supremes
| US#6
| Baritone saxophone
|-
| 1965
| Four Tops Second Album
| The Four Tops
| US#20
| Baritone saxophone
|-
| 1966
| I Hear a Symphony
| The Supremes
| US#8
| Baritone saxophone
|-
|1966
|The Supremes A' Go-Go
|The Supremes
|US#1, UK#15
|Baritone saxophone
|-
| 1968
| Out of Sight
| Maxine Brown
|  
| Producer, Arranger
|-
| 1968
| Workin' On A Groovy Thing
| Barbara Lewis
|  
| Arranger
|-
| 1969
| The Many Grooves of Barbara Lewis
| Barbara Lewis
|  
| Arranger
|-
| 1969
| Jealous Kind Of Fella
| Garland Green
|  
| Arranger
|-
| 1969
| Re-Light My Fire
| Rhetta Hughes
|  
| Co-Producer, arranger
|-
| 1973
| Loleatta
| Loleatta Holloway
|  
| Arranger
|-
| 1975
| Loneliness & Temptation
| Clarence Carter
|  
| Arranger
|-
| 1975
| Kickin'''
| The Mighty Clouds of Joy
|  
| Arranger
|-
| 1975
| Bad Luck| Atlanta Disco Band
|  
| Writer, Arranger, Musician
|-
| 1976
| No Way Back| The Dells
| US R&B#47
| Writer, Arranger, Producer
|-
| 1977
| Here Am I| Dave Crawford
|  
| Arranger
|}

Sources
 Flory, Andrew. I Hear a Symphony: Motown and crossover R&B, University of Michigan Press, 2017, USA
 Moore, Dave. 'HOF: Mike Terry - Pre Production Inductee', Soul Source magazine, November 7, 2014
 Moss, Robb. 'Mike Terry, Sax God', Manifesto magazine, Issue 85, July 2007, UK
 Randle, Bill. 'Bill Randle in conversation with Mike Terry', Soulful Kinda Music magazine, June 1994
 Rylatt, Keith, Groovesville USA: The Detroit Soul & R&B Index, Stuart Russell, 2010, UK
 Thornton, Jason H. 'The Andrew "Mike" Terry Story', There's That Beat! The Rare Soul Magazine, Issue 4, 2007, UK
 White, Adam, and Bronson, Fred. The Billboard Book of Number One Rhythm and Blues Hits, BPI Communications, 1993
 Williams, Richard. 'Mike Terry Obituary', The Guardian'', December 1, 2008, UK

References

1940 births
2008 deaths
Musicians from Detroit
African-American saxophonists
American male saxophonists
The Funk Brothers members
Rhythm and blues saxophonists
Record producers from Texas
Motown artists
20th-century American saxophonists
20th-century American male musicians
20th-century African-American musicians
21st-century African-American people